Mangat Ram Singhal (born on 14 November 1942) is an Indian politician from Delhi. He has been active in politics since early youth and college days. He belongs to Indian National Congress Party. He was elected to the Municipal Corporation of Delhi (MCD) in 1977 for the first time. He was again elected to MCD in 1983. He was also the Chairman of Works Committee, MCD from 1983-1990. He served as a Councillor till 1988. He has thrice served as member of Delhi Legislative Assembly. He was elected to the Second Legislative Assembly for the first time in 1998 and was the Chief Whip of Congress Party in the Delhi Legislative Assembly. He was again elected as a member of Third and Fourth Legislative Assembly and was endowed with the responsibility of Minister of Industry, Land, Social Welfare, Labour & Employment, Law Justice & Legislative Affairs and Elections in Second Dikshit cabinet and Third Dikshit cabinet. He has represented Adarsh Nagar Assembly constituency from 1998 till 2013 in the Delhi Legislative Assembly.

Positions held

Electoral performances

References

Living people
20th-century Indian politicians
Indian National Congress politicians from Delhi
1942 births